Osiris (Amon Tomaz) is a superhero appearing in American comic books published by DC Comics. This version of the character was a contemporary to Captain Marvel Jr., with a connection to the character Black Adam.

Amon Tomaz was a youth who was brutually beaten to near death by members of Intergang, an organized crime group given access to technology by the New Gods of Apokolips. Rescued by his sister and Black Adam, the anti-hero would share a portion of his power, allowing him to become Osiris. The character would serve as a member of the Black Marvel Family, a counterpart to the Marvel Family. After the New 52 reboot, Amon is instead a non-powered teenager, freedom fighter, and translator of the Sons of Adam, a group of revolutionaries whose goals include resurrecting Black Adam. 

A new incarnation of the character named Behrad Tarazi appeared in the Arrowverse television series Legends of Tomorrow, played by Shayan Sobhian. Amon Tomaz made his live-action debut in the DC Extended Universe film Black Adam (2022), played by Bodhi Sabongui.

Publication history
Osiris was first depicted in Teen Titans #38 (September 2006), making his full appearance in 52 #23 (December 2006), created by Geoff Johns, Grant Morrison, Greg Rucka, Mark Waid, Keith Giffen, and Drew Johnson. He appeared extensively in the 2006-2007 weekly series 52.

Fictional character biography
Osiris first appears in a picture of teen superheroes and was a part of the Teen Titans between the events of the Infinite Crisis and One Year Later. Week 23 of the series 52 reveals that Osiris is Amon Tomaz, brother of the hero Isis. He is also the brother-in-law of Black Adam.

Amon has been repeatedly beaten and tortured by members of the criminal cult Intergang who are trying to brainwash him into joining the cult. He refuses to join them time and again and tries to run away, resulting in the beatings getting worse, as Intergang tries to make sure he will never walk again. He is discovered by the Question and Renee Montoya who alert Isis and Black Adam to his location. The super-powered couple arrive to free him, and Isis discovers that her powers over nature are not enough to heal his wounds as they are too deep, and that Amon will never walk again. Black Adam shares the powers of his gods with the boy, and Amon calls down the mystical lightning by saying his benefactor's name, "Black Adam". He gains the same powers as the rest of the Marvel Family. Amon's paraplegia, empowerment, and age all vaguely resemble Captain Marvel, Jr.'s.

During Week 26, he along with Black Adam and his sister, Isis, fly to Nanda Parbat, carrying Renee Montoya and the Question, leaving them there.

Later he feels that he wants friends. He and the other Black Marvels help the other Marvels defeat Sabbac on Halloween using their magic lightning when he tries to sacrifice children to Neron. After doing acts of good and helping people throughout the world, he travels to America to join the Teen Titans, along with his "friend" Sobek, a bioengineered talking crocodile taken from Sivana's labs after being found during a charity dinner with Venus Sivana, who he named. Captain Marvel Jr. was at first skeptical because of Amon's connection to Black Adam, but is emotionally moved by Osiris' eagerness and promises to vouch for him. Junior's only condition is that Osiris must "convince the rest of the world" of his pure intentions. Osiris, filled with hope, accepts. However, shortly afterwards, the Persuader began torturing Isis during a conflict between the Black Adam family and the Suicide Squad with his atomic axe, cutting open her cheek. Angered, Osiris uses too much force and tears Persuader in half, turning public opinion against the Black Marvel family (it's later observed that doctored footage of the attack was broadcast to give the impression Osiris enjoyed the kill by splicing in footage taken from his time with the Teen Titans). Sobek brings him apples and tries to comfort him.

Feeling despair over his killing of the Persuader, Osiris travels to the Rock of Eternity to ask Captain Marvel to remove his powers, as he feels they are a curse and are destroying Khandaq. Black Adam and Isis attempt to assure him that his abilities are not evil in nature and he can still do good. Marvel states that Osiris is not a bad person as the Sins (demons imprisoned in Marvel's lair) did not want him. Osiris attacks Black Adam, but stops his anger when he accidentally hits Isis. Osiris relents and returns home with his sister and brother-in-law. Days later, Osiris, still not convinced, plans to leave Khandaq forever with Sobek, who persuades the teenager to reject the powers of Black Adam and revert to Amon to rid himself of his 'curse'. Osiris decides that being unable to walk must be his penance. Osiris does so and is devoured alive by Sobek, who reveals himself as Famine, Horseman of Apokolips.

Despite his short time as a Titan, a memorial statue of Osiris has been erected in Titans Tower.

Blackest Night 
Osiris was later reanimated as a Black Lantern. As part of DC's January campaign of bringing back 'dead comic runs', the Black Lantern Osiris featured in the one-shot The Power of Shazam! revival. However, because Black Adam had magically restored Amon's body to its empowered form before its entombment, Osiris was able to resist the ring's control and ultimately severed his own connection, along with that of the Black Lantern Sobek by using his lightning which struck both him and Sobek, finally dying a hero.

Brightest Day 
Along with several other heroes and villains Osiris was brought back to life at the end of Blackest Night. Due to being dead during Osiris's tenure with the Titans, Superboy humorously asks Kid Flash who Osiris is, referring to him as "Black Adam Jr.". Osiris ignores his fellow Titans, simply stating that he wishes to return home.

Following this, Osiris returns to Khandaq, vowing to restore the kingdom to its former prosperity. Osiris takes the petrified bodies of Black Adam and Isis and flies off to an unknown destination. During a flashback, it is revealed that Osiris attempted to return to the Teen Titans, only to leave in anger after being told by Wonder Girl to turn himself over to the authorities for killing Persuader.

Angered when he discovers that he does not possess the power to restore his loved ones, Osiris enlists in Deathstroke's new team of Titans hoping that the mercenary will be able to help him in his goal. During his first mission with the team, Osiris assists in the murder of Ryan Choi, the fourth Atom. During his confrontation with Choi, Osiris tells the hero that he is sorry that he has to kill him. After the mission, Osiris becomes angered at Deathstroke's choice to name the team after the Teen Titans, claiming that they do not deserve it.

After the Titans' second mission, Osiris returns to his quarters, in which the statues of Adam and Adrianna are. He notices that Adrianna's statue has changed slightly, developing a crack in her cheek. Osiris sits and meditates, willing that Adrianna shows him the way. The White Lantern symbol appears above him as he does so.

Osiris is soon after contacted by the Entity, who tells him to free Isis. Just prior to being contacted by the Entity, Osiris enters into a verbal altercation with two of his teammates, Cinder and Tattooed Man, and ends up being cut across the face by the latter. Shocked after seeing that Tattooed Man was somehow able to make him bleed, a confused Osiris flies off into the sky, where he is eventually approached by the Entity. After learning that he must free his sister, Osiris muses that he may be able to rescue Black Adam as well, and claims that once his sister and Adam are freed, he will make the Titans regret mistreating him.

During a battle with a drug kingpin named Elijah, Osiris again experiences a vision of Isis after Pisces knocks him out. She tells her brother that he is guilty for his hand in the murder of Ryan Choi, and that in order to free her, he will have to kill more people, making many more sacrifices. Osiris accidentally electrocutes Elijah after waking from his vision when he yells about Isis, and returns home to find that more cracks have appeared on Isis' statue. He then surmises that it was Elijah's death which caused the cracks, and states that he will indeed have to kill more people to free Isis from her prison.

During a breakout at Arkham Asylum, Osiris is confronted by Killer Croc whom Osiris believes to be his old friend Sobek, who killed him, and brutally attacks him. Osiris kills a guard with lightning, although by doing so he releases all of the prisons' inmates. While they battle, the new Batman arrives and see Osiris, realising that he has been working with Deathstroke's team. Batman tries to get Osiris to explain his actions, but Osiris eventually escapes from Arkham Asylum and departs with Deathstroke's team. Osiris travels to Philadelphia where he brutally kills several armed criminals until Freddy Freeman, the new Shazam, arrives. Osiris and Freddy fight, with Freddy trying to convince Osiris to stop killing. Osiris tricks Freddy into thinking he has been convinced, then uses the magic lightning to steal Freddy's powers and gives them to Isis, restoring her. The Entity then speaks to Osiris telling him that his mission has been accomplished and his life has been restored. However, Isis' first words to Osiris when he returns to her are "What have you done to me?" Osiris discovers that the deaths he caused have corrupted Isis' soul, causing her to fluctuate between her normal personality and a cruel callous one. While watching over her, he sees a news report on Khandaq being attacked by Qurac, and returns to find she has escaped. Isis attempts to commit suicide by lightning in order to free herself from her corrupted soul, but Osiris shields her with his own body. When they awake, Isis discovers that the corruption has left her, but she still feels it inside Osiris, and it worries her.

Later, Osiris attacks the Qurac soldiers alongside Isis; she learns that Osiris became more violent to killing soldiers. Osiris then join Deathstroke's Titans to attacks Justice League, where they were stopped by Isis and forced them to leave Khandaq. She further uses her rulership to withdraw from the United Nations, and says they will outlaw and recognize no power but their own or risk the starting of World War III. When they leave, Osiris is stunned when his sister, Isis tells him that he is no longer welcome in Khandaq because of his bloodlust.

Upon returning to the labyrinth, Deathstroke reveals to them that his proceeding items were used to create a healing machine called "Methuselah" for his dying son Jericho. After healing Jericho, Deathstroke claims the machine can also resurrect the dead and can bring Black Adam as well. Osiris initially accepts, but after Cinder declares the Device a curse, he joins him and Tattooed Man in fighting the other Titans to destroy the device. After Cinder sacrifices herself to destroy the device, Osiris leaves with Doctor Sivana in tow. He demands that Doctor Sivana create a new Methuselah Device to restore Black Adam, but Sivana asks in return that he helps him kill the wizard Shazam.

The New 52 
In 2011, "The New 52" rebooted the DC Universe. Amon Tomas is a young human recruited by the Sons of Adam, a terrorist group working on freeing Khandaq from Ibac's dictatorship. Due to his translating abilities he is tasked in reading an ancient spell to resurrect Black Adam. But before completing it, the military attacks them. Mortally injured, Amon makes his sister Adrianna complete the spell which revives Black Adam.

Other characters named Osiris

Agent of the Overmaster

Osiris appeared in Justice League International vol. II #42 (March 1994) and was created by Gerard Jones and Charles Wojtkiewicz. He appeared monthly in that title and its companions, Justice League America and Justice League Task Force until August 1994.

Osiris is an Egyptian hero who wears a high-tech suit of golden armor and believes he is the god Osiris re-incarnate. He first appeared as an agent of the Overmaster and a member of the Cadre of the Immortal. After the Immortal’s death, Osiris finally perceived the true threat of the Overmaster, he, Seneca and Mohammed Ibn Bornu allied themselves with the Justice League in order to stop the Overmaster.

God of death
This Osiris appeared in the one-shot Sandman Presents: The Thessaliad #1 (March 2002) and was created by Bill Willingham and Shawn McManus.

Osiris is the Egyptian god of death, fertility, and resurrection. He is also the lord of the Egyptian underworld and was appointed to be one of three judges of the deceased, alongside Thoth and Anubis. In modern times, Osiris and the death gods Hel, Morrigan and Pluto conspired to steal the life force of a young girl named Thessaly, because of her status as the last Thessalian witch. Their scheme failed and the young witch dismembered the Ibis-headed immortal and scattered his body parts across time and space.

Powers and abilities
When he says the name of his brother-in-law and benefactor Black Adam, Amon Tomaz is transformed into Osiris. In this form, he is granted access to Black Adam's powers, which are derived from ancient Egyptian gods. These gods and powers are:

Other versions

Flashpoint
In the alternate timeline of the Flashpoint event, Osiris is a prince of Kahndaq and member of the H.I.V.E. council. He voted for using nuclear weapons to end the war in Western Europe between Aquaman and Wonder Woman, believing the death of his sister, Isis was caused by them. When Traci Thirteen battles the council, she is able to defeat him by casting spells ending in her saying 'Shazam!' causing Osiris to turn back.

In other media
 A character inspired by Amon Tomaz named Behrad Tarazi appears in Legends of Tomorrow, portrayed by Shayan Sobhian as an adult and by Bodhi Sabongui in flashbacks. He originally hails from a possible dystopian future in 2042, in which he possessed aerokinesis via the Air Totem before he was killed by A.R.G.U.S. After the Legends erase the dystopian future, a revived and altered Behrad joins them.
 Amon Tomaz appears in Black Adam, portrayed by Bodhi Sabongui. This version is Adrianna Tomaz's teenage son instead of her younger brother.

Collected editions
Blackest Night: Rise of the Black Lanterns (collects The Power of Shazam! #48)
Titans: Villains for Hire (collects Titans 24-27 and Titans: Villains for Hire Special #1)

References

External links
 DCU Guide: Osiris, Agent of the Overmaster
 DCU Guide: Osiris, Egyptian deity

Characters created by Keith Giffen
Characters created by Geoff Johns
Characters created by Grant Morrison
Characters created by Greg Rucka
Characters created by Mark Waid
Comics characters introduced in 1994
Comics characters introduced in 2002
Comics characters introduced in 2006
DC Comics characters with superhuman strength
DC Comics characters who are shapeshifters
DC Comics characters who can move at superhuman speeds 
DC Comics characters who can teleport 
DC Comics characters who use magic
DC Comics deities
DC Comics male supervillains
DC Comics male superheroes
Fictional characters with electric or magnetic abilities
Fictional characters with eidetic memory
Fictional characters with precognition
Fictional characters with dimensional travel abilities
Fictional characters who can manipulate time
Egyptian mythology in comics
Mythology in DC Comics
Egyptian superheroes
Marvel Family
Black Adam